Yoo Na-ul (born September 23, 1978), better known by the mononym Naul (Hangul: 나얼), is a South Korean singer, artist, and member of Brown Eyed Soul, signed under in Next Music. He released his debut solo album, Back to the Soul Flight, on January 8, 2005. Naul has worked as a professor of music for Korea Nazarene University.

Career

Before debut
During high school Naul participated in an a cappella group with his friends and in 1996, the group progressed to the finals in a radio program contest called "A starry night".

Anthem (1999)
Naul made his debut with the four member R&B group Anthem. The group participated in SBS's New Era Music Competition in 1998, at which point they won the grand prize with the song "Letting You Go". The band released an album the following year, but did not gain much popularity.

Brown Eyes (2001–2003, 2008)

In 2001 Naul paired with Yoon Gun for the duo Brown Eyes. Naul provided main vocals and the cover art for their albums, while Yoon Gun provided backup vocals and composed and produced the music. They were well received and sold well. The duo disbanded in 2003 after releasing two albums, but reunited in 2008 for a third album.

Brown Eyed Soul (2003–present)
Having a period of hiatus after 2nd album of 'Brown Eyes', Naul organized a band called 'Brown Eyed Soul' with three more people (Jungyub, Yongjun, Sung Hoon).

Solo
Naul has released several solo albums, the second of which was predominantly composed of song covers. In September 2012 he released Principle of My Soul, which contained original songs. The single "Memories of Wind" charted as number one. On March 28, 2018, his 2nd full album, Sound Doctrine, was released.

Artistry
Naul took classes on art and design in college. He has painted the artwork for some of his albums and some of his work has been curated in a charity exhibition.

Discography

Studio albums

Single albums

Singles

Music videos

References

1978 births
Living people
South Korean rhythm and blues singers
South Korean pop singers
21st-century South Korean male singers